Maccabi Kishronot Hadera is an Israeli women's football club from Hadera competing in the Israeli First Division and the Israeli Women's Cup.

History
The club was established in 2004, and played ever since in the Israeli first division, never finishing below 3rd in the league, twice finishing as runners-up. In 2009–10 the club finished as runners-up and level on points with league leaders, ASA Tel Aviv University and competed in a play-off match for the championship, losing 0–6.

In the cup, the club appeared in two finals, in 2011–12 and 2013–14, losing both finals to ASA Tel Aviv University. In 2014–15 the two teams met again in the final, with the club winning 1–0 to earn its first trophy.

In 2010–11, the club operated a B team, who played in the 2nd division. The B team finished as runners-up in the league, losing to Maccabi Tzur Shalom Bialik in a promotion/relegation play-off match 0–2, and lost to Hapoel Be'er Sheva 1–7 in the 2nd Division League Cup final.

Titles

Maccabi Kishronot Hadera
Winners:
Israeli Cup (1)
2014–15,

Runners-up:
Israeli 1st Division (2)
2009–10, 2013–14
Israeli Cup (2)
2011–12, 2013–14

Maccabi Kishronot Hadera B
Runners-up:
Israeli 2nd Division (1)
2010–11
Ligat Nashim Shniya Cup (1)
 2010–11 (as Maccabi Kishronot Hadera B)

Current squad

References

External links
Maccabi Kishronot Hadera 
Maccabi Kishronot Hadera Israeli Football Association 
Maccabi Kishronot Hadera B Israeli Football Association 
 

Women's football clubs in Israel
Association football clubs established in 2004